Sharmila (Hindi : शर्मिला) is a Hindu/Sanskrit Indian popular feminine given name, which means "comfort", "joy" and"protection".

Notable people named Sharmila 
 Sharmila Anandasabapathy, Sri Lankan-American physician
Sharmila Bhattacharya (born 1964), American-Nigerian doctor and NASA scientist
 Sharmila Biswas (born 19 November 1962), Indian dancer and choreographer
 Sharmila Chakraborty (born 1961), Indian cricketer
 Sharmila Devar (born 10 July 1977), American actress
 Sharmila Farooqi (born 1978), Pakistani politician
 Sharmila M. Mukhopadhyay, Indian professor of material science
 Sharmila Nicollet (born 1991), French-Indian golfer
 Sharmila Rege (1964–2013), Indian sociologist, feminist and writer
 Irom Chanu Sharmila (born 1972), Indian poet, political and civil rights activist
 Sharmila Tagore (born 1944), Indian actress
Y. S. Sharmila (born 17 December 1973), Indian politician

Notable people named Sarmila 
Sarmila Bose (born 1959), Harvard Academic

Notable people named Sharmeila 
 Sharmiela Mandre (born 1989), Indian actress

Hindu given names
Indian feminine given names